Aphalangia is a syndrome with the characteristic absence of the phalanx bone on one or more digits.

See also
Dactyly

References

Further reading

 Wiebe, E. L. "Intermediate digital aphalangia. A surgeon's dilemma--two bone toes." Journal of the American Podiatry Association 63.10 (1973): 522–524.

Congenital disorders of musculoskeletal system